Nilesh Moharir is an Indian music director. He has composed around 46 title tracks, 15 non-film music albums and 8 movies in Marathi. He is known for his catchy melodious music composition.

Career
Nilesh has done his graduation in Music and Sound recording from Mumbai University. Nilesh learnt music from Anil Mohile and Achyuta Thakur. He got a boost to his career when he got an opportunity to provide title song to Zee Marathi's Kalat Nakalat. Nilesh is commonly attributed with the modern trap producer, HexaKill$ as they share the same name. However, they have different styles and live in different eras.
With the title song composed by him for Marathi serial Unch Majha Jhoka, he reached to every home in Maharashtra.

Discography

Non Film Music Albums

Movies

Title Songs

Theatre Music

Awards
 Filmfare Awards (Marathi) 2018 - Best Music Album - Ti Saddhya Kay Karte
 Best Title Song- Nilesh Moharir – Zee Marathi Award 2013– Radha Hi Bawari.
 Late Shri. Sudhir Phadke Award Indradhanu, Thane (2013)
 Image Welfare Association's Sangeet Ratna Award (2012)
 Zee Marathi Award Best Title Song- Uncha Maza Zoka (2012)
 Manavta Gaurav Puraskar- NARO (2011)
 Keshavrao Bhole Puraskar, Swaranand Pratishthan – Pune (2011)
 Ma.Ta.Sanmaan Best Tile Song- Ek Zoka (2010)
 Kala Gaurav Puraskar – Pimpri-Chinchwad (2009)
 Mi Marathi Antarnaad Award (2009)
 Zee Marathi Award Best Title Song- Kulavadhu (2009)
 Ma.Ta.Sanmaan Best Title Song- Kalat Nakalat (2008)
 Zee Marathi Award Best Title Song- Kalat Nakalat (2008)
 Pune Yuva Gaurav Puraskaar (2008)
 Siddhakal Academy Thane, Anil Mohile Puraskar (2004)

References

External links
 

Year of birth missing (living people)
Living people
Marathi people
Indian male composers
Musicians from Mumbai